Devil's Island (Pakleni otok) is a Croatian film directed by Vladimir Tadej. It was released in 1979.

External links
 

1979 films
Croatian war drama films
1970s Croatian-language films
World War II naval films
Films set on islands
War films set in Partisan Yugoslavia
Films about Yugoslav Resistance